Clare Town Hall, also known as Town of Clare Museum, is a historic town hall building located at Clare in St. Lawrence County, New York. It was built in 1897 and is a simple 1-story, three-by-three-bay, clapboard-sided frame building, 30 feet wide and 50 feet, 6 inches long.  It was used as the town hall until 1968, when it became the town museum.

It was listed on the National Register of Historic Places in 2004.

References

City and town halls on the National Register of Historic Places in New York (state)
Government buildings completed in 1897
Buildings and structures in St. Lawrence County, New York
Museums in St. Lawrence County, New York
National Register of Historic Places in St. Lawrence County, New York
1897 establishments in New York (state)